Brock Alexander Trotter (born January 16, 1987) is a Canadian professional ice hockey Centre who was most recently under contract to Starbulls Rosenheim of the German Oberliga. He played two games in the National Hockey League with the Montreal Canadiens during the 2009–10 season.

Playing career
Trotter played collegiate hockey at the University of Denver in the Western Collegiate Hockey Association.

On April 15, 2008, Trotter was recalled from the Hamilton Bulldogs of the American Hockey League. He was expected to play his first NHL game on April 19, 2008, against the Boston Bruins but was a late scratch. In the 2009–10 season on February 5, 2010 he was again recalled from Hamilton Bulldogs to Montreal. He finally made his NHL debut on February 6, 2010 against the Pittsburgh Penguins in a 5-3 victory. Playing with Bulldogs teammates Ryan White and David Desharnais, Trotter went scoreless in two games before returning to the Bulldogs to lead the team with 36 goals and place second to Desharnais with 77 points.

On July 28, 2010, Trotter left the Canadiens organization and North America as a free agent to sign a two-year contract with Latvian team Dinamo Riga of the KHL.

On July 4, 2011, Trotter signed a one-year, two-way contract to return with the Canadiens. Trotter's return to Montreal was short lived when on October 23, 2011, he was traded to the Phoenix Coyotes along with a seventh-round pick in the 2012 NHL Entry Draft in exchange for forward Petteri Nokelainen and defenceman Garrett Stafford. He was then assigned to the Coyotes' AHL affiliate, the Portland Pirates. Trotter joined his third team in the 2011–12 season, when he was reassigned by the Coyotes as a part of an AHL trade for goaltender Peter Mannino and Kenndal McArdle to the St. John's IceCaps on March 2, 2012.

After sitting out two consecutive seasons with injury, Trotter opted to make a return to professional hockey by signing a one-month trial contract with Croatian club KHL Medveščak Zagreb of the KHL on June 24, 2014.

During the 2015–16 off season Trotter attended training camp with the Manitoba Moose of the American Hockey League. On October 16, 2015, Trotter signed a one-year contract with Swedish club IF Björklöven of the second-tier league Hockeyallsvenskan. He spent the 2016–17 season playing in Finland's top-flight Liiga (SaiPa, Oulun Kärpät), before signing with ERC Ingolstadt of the German Deutsche Eishockey Liga in July 2017.

Before opening the 2017–18 season, Trotter was released from his contract with Ingolstadt, opting to return to North America and secure an opening night roster spot on a professional try-out with the Chicago Wolves of the AHL on October 6, 2017. He recorded 1 assist in 4 games before he was later released by the Wolves on October 25, 2017. He later joined the Stavanger Oilers of the GET-ligaen, however, he never made an appearance for the club before returning for a second stint with IF Björklöven on February 15, 2018.

In 2018–19, Trotter posted 55 points in 42 games for Dornbirner EC in the Austrian Hockey League. After spending the following season in the Slovak Extraliga with HKM Zvolen, Trotter left as a free agent and his KHL rights were reacquired by former club Dinamo Riga on May 5, 2020.

Trotter has since had spells in France with Dragons de Rouen, Romania with ASC Corona Brasov and Germany with Starbulls Rosenheim. 

Then, in July 2022, Trotter signed a one-year deal with UK EIHL side Coventry Blaze. However in August 2022, it was announced Trotter would no longer be joining Coventry.

Career statistics

Regular season and playoffs

International

Awards and honours

References

External links

1987 births
Canadian expatriate ice hockey players in Croatia
Canadian expatriate ice hockey players in Latvia
Canadian expatriate ice hockey players in Finland
Canadian expatriate ice hockey players in Sweden
Canadian ice hockey centres
Chicago Wolves players
Dauphin Kings players
Denver Pioneers men's ice hockey players
Dinamo Riga players
Dornbirn Bulldogs players
Dragons de Rouen players
Hamilton Bulldogs (AHL) players
Ice hockey people from Manitoba
IF Björklöven players
KHL Medveščak Zagreb players
Lincoln Stars players
Living people
Montreal Canadiens players
Oulun Kärpät players
Portland Pirates players
SaiPa players
Sportspeople from Brandon, Manitoba
Starbulls Rosenheim players
St. John's IceCaps players
Undrafted National Hockey League players
HKM Zvolen players
Savannah Ghost Pirates players
Canadian expatriate ice hockey players in Austria
Canadian expatriate ice hockey players in the United States
Canadian expatriate ice hockey players in Romania
Canadian expatriate ice hockey players in Slovakia
Canadian expatriate ice hockey players in Germany
Canadian expatriate ice hockey players in France